Elena Vladimirovna Khrustaleva (born 28 September 1980, in Krasnoyarsk) is a former Russian (until 2001, and since 2002 till 2006), Belarusian (since 2001 till 2002), and Kazakhstani (since 2006) biathlete. She won a silver medal at the 2010 Winter Olympics in Vancouver. This was Kazakhstan's 6th medal at the Winter Olympic Games and 45th overall Olympic medal.

Career

Khrustaleva made her international debut at the Junior European Championships in 2000 at Zakopane. She won gold in singles and with the Russian squadron.  Shortly afterwards, at the Junior World Championships, in Hochfilzen, she won a silver in the pursuit behind Sabrina Buchholz.  After the season, she was ranked fourth in singles and sprint. At the Junior World Championships, in Khanty-Mansiysk, a summer biathlon, she won silver behind Tatiana Moiseyeva.

The following season, Khrustaleva changed her citizenship with Belarus. At the Biathlon World Cup, in Hochfilzen, she achieved 36th place in the sprint. Halfway through the season, just before the 2002 Winter Olympics, Khrustaleva achieved her best World Cup rankings. In the individual and the squadron, Khrustaleva achieved seventh and sixth. At the 2002 Winter Olympics, Khrustaleva managed 33rd place in the sprint and a 30th place in the pursuit.

For the 2003/04 season, she again changed her citizenship back with Russia.  At the European Championships in 2003, in Forni Avoltri, Khrustaleva won gold in singles.  With the Russian squadron, in 2005, in Novosibirsk, she won gold in the relay.

For the 2006/07 season, she changed her citizenship with Kazakhstan. At the World Championships in 2007, a summer biathlon in Otepää, she won silver medals in the sprint and mass start behind Natalya Sokolova.  In the individual competition of the World Cup 2009, Khrustaleva achieved sixth place. At the 2010 Winter Olympics, she managed 5th place in the sprint and 2nd place in the Individual.

References

External links
 Elena Khrustaleva's profile, from https://web.archive.org/web/20100222080013/http://www.vancouver2010.com/; retrieved 2010-02-18.
 Elena Khrustaleva's profile, from the International Biathlon Union; retrieved 2010-02-19.
 

1980 births
Russian female biathletes
Belarusian female biathletes
Kazakhstani female biathletes
Naturalized citizens of Belarus
Naturalised citizens of Kazakhstan
Living people
Olympic biathletes of Kazakhstan
Olympic biathletes of Belarus
Biathletes at the 2002 Winter Olympics
Biathletes at the 2010 Winter Olympics
Biathletes at the 2014 Winter Olympics
Olympic silver medalists for Kazakhstan
Sportspeople from Krasnoyarsk
Olympic medalists in biathlon
Medalists at the 2010 Winter Olympics
Russian emigrants to Belarus
Russian emigrants to Kazakhstan
Asian Games medalists in biathlon
Biathletes at the 2007 Asian Winter Games
Biathletes at the 2011 Asian Winter Games
Asian Games gold medalists for Kazakhstan
Asian Games silver medalists for Kazakhstan
Asian Games bronze medalists for Kazakhstan
Medalists at the 2007 Asian Winter Games
Medalists at the 2011 Asian Winter Games